Konya Athletic Field is an outdoor sports venue for track and field athletics events located in Konya, Turkey.

The athletic field is located at SilleParsana neighborhood of Selçuklu district in Konya, Turkey.  Built primarily to host the track and field athletics events at the 2021 Islamic Solidarity Games, it was opened ion 19 June 2022. It has a seating capacity of 1,500.

References

Athletics (track and field) venues in Turkey
Sports venues in Konya
Outdoor arenas
Sports venues completed in 2022
2022 establishments in Turkey
Selçuklu District